This article lists the cities in Venezuela by its population, according to the Instituto Nacional de Estadística (Venezuela) (commonly referred to as INE in Spanish). All cities with a population of at least 100,000 residents are listed here, capitals of states are shown in bold.

List

See also
 List of cities
 List of cities and towns in Venezuela, a list that includes all the small towns in alphabetical order (instead of order of size)

References
 Largest cities in Venezuela
 Instituto Nacional de Estadística - Publicaciones/Demografica/Cuadro3

 
Venezuela, List of cities in
Venezuela
Venezuela
Cities